Nasehabad (also Romanized as Nāşeḩābād; also known as Garābād, Garrabad, and Naşrābād) is a village in Haram Rud-e Sofla Rural District, Samen District, Malayer County, Hamadan Province, Iran. At the 2006 census, its population was 51, in 13 families.

References 

Populated places in Malayer County